A referendum on introducing an alcohol tax was held in Liechtenstein on 26 May 1929. The proposal was approved by 53.9% of voters.

Results

References

1929 referendums
1929 in Liechtenstein
Referendums in Liechtenstein
Prohibition referendums
May 1929 events